Take Me to Tomorrow is the second studio album by American singer-songwriter John Denver. It was released in May 1970.

Track listing

Personnel

Musicians
John Denver – electric and acoustic guitar, 12-string guitar, vocals, arranger
Stan Free – organ on "Forest Lawn", piano on "Sticky Summer Weather", accordion on "Jimmy Newman"
Paul Griffin – piano, organ, celesta
Herbie Lovelle – drums
Joe Macho – bass on "Take Me to Tomorrow" and "Anthem-Revelation"
George Marge – English horn on "Sticky Summer Weather"
Paul Prestopino – lead guitar on "Take Me to Tomorrow" and "Sticky Summer Weather", dobro on "Forest Lawn", autoharp on "Amsterdam" and "Anthem-Revelation", 12-string guitar on "Aspenglow"
Russ Savakus – bass
Denny Seiwell – drums on "Take Me to Tomorrow" and "Anthem-Revelation" 
Marvin Stamm – piccolo trumpet on "Anthem-Revelation"

Production
Jim Aylward – liner notes
Jim Crotty – recording engineer
Milton Okun – producer, arranger

References

John Denver albums
1970 albums
RCA Records albums
Albums produced by Milt Okun